The Windy City Open is an annual men's and women's squash tournament held each February in Chicago, United States. It is part of the PSA World Series, the highest level of professional squash competition. The event was first held in 2001.

Results

Men's

Women's

See also
 PSA World Tour
 PSA World Series

References

External links
Windy City Open Official Website
PSA Windy City Open 2014
Illinois Squash Professional News